Sanjeev Seth is an Indian TV actor. Currently, he is known for his role of Vishambharnath Maheshwari in Star Plus's Yeh Rishta Kya Kehlata Hai and its spin-off Yeh Rishtey Hain Pyaar Ke.

Personal life

32 year old Seth married 12-year-younger Marathi actress Resham Tipnis who was just 20 in the year 1993 and has 2 kids with her ; Rishika Seth (born: 6 November 1996) and Manav Seth (born: 24 September 2000), who now live with Resham after their divorce in the year 2004. Sanjeev then remarried actress Lata Sabharwal Seth on the insistence of his kids in 2010. They have one son Aarav Seth who was born in May 2013.

Career
Seth made his career with Karishma Kaa Karishma as Vikaram and then Seth signed for the role of Vishambharnath Maheshwari in Star Plus TV serial Yeh Rishta Kya Kehlata Hai. Sanjeev and his wife Lata also appeared in Star Plus dance show Nach Baliye 6 in 2013.

Television

References

External links 

 

1961 births
Living people
Indian male television actors
Indian male soap opera actors
Male actors from Mumbai